Didrik Schjerven Søderlind (born March 13, 1971) is a Norwegian secular humanist and skeptic who works as a journalist and author. He works as an advisor for the Norwegian Humanist Association and has previously been a journalist for forskning.no with science, religion, and culture as primary areas of interest. He has published monographies of his own as well as contributed to anthologies, especially about lifestance and skepticism. 

In 2015, Søderlind together with the priest Stian Kilde Aarebrot published the book Presten og ateisten (The Priest and the Atheist) in which the two through correspondence discuss faith and doubt through the perspectives of their different lifestances.

Published literature 
 Lords of Chaos: The Bloody Rise of the Satanic Metal Underground, 2003 (with Michael Moynihan) 
 Kristen-Norge. En oppdagelsesreise, 2010  
 Presten og ateisten, 2015 (with Stian Kilde Aarebrot)

References

External links 
 Author profile at Humanist forlag

1971 births
Living people
Norwegian humanists
Norwegian atheists
Norwegian writers
Norwegian skeptics